86th Regiment may refer to:

 86th Regiment of Foot (Rutland Regiment), a unit of the British Army 
 86th (Royal County Down) Regiment of Foot, a unit of the British Army 
 86th (Cornwall) Medium Regiment, Royal Artillery, air defence unit of the British Territorial Army
 86th (East Anglian) (Hertfordshire Yeomanry) Field Regiment, Royal Artillery, British Yeomanry unit
 86th (Honourable Artillery Company) Heavy Anti-Aircraft Regiment, Royal Artillery, a unit of the British Territorial Army
 86th Field Artillery Regiment, a unit of the United States Army
 86th Infantry Regiment, a unit of the United States Army
 86th Armoured Regiment (India), an armoured unit of the Indian Army
 86th Guards Fighter Aviation Regiment, aviation regiment of the Soviet Air Forces

American Civil War
 86th Illinois Volunteer Infantry Regiment, a unit of the Union (Northern) Army 
 86th Indiana Infantry Regiment, a unit of the Union (Northern) Army 
 86th New York Volunteer Infantry, a unit of the Union (Northern) Army 
 86th Ohio Infantry, a unit of the Union (Northern) Army

See also
 86th Division (disambiguation)
 86th Brigade (disambiguation)